Slatko od snova is the soundtrack to the 1994 film of the same name by Serbian singer Dragana Mirković.

Track listing
Daj mi malo nade
Changes
Embargo
Slatko od snova
Red Ferrari
Bruno X
Elvis is Here
Riding Through the Fire
Baby, Don't You Know
Give a Little Sunshine

References

1994 soundtrack albums
Dragana Mirković albums
Film soundtracks